The Max Planck Institute for Social Law and Social Policy is a research facility located in Maxvorstadt, Munich, Bavaria, Germany.

History
The Institute was created in 1976 by the Max Planck Society. Upon completion in 1980, the Max Planck Institute for Foreign and International Social Law merged into it. Its director until 1990 was Hans F. Zacher, who was succeeded by Bernd Baron von Maydell until 2002. Since then, the director has been Ulrich Becker. In July 2011 the institute were enlarged with a second department, the Munich Center for the Economics of Aging (MEA) headed by Axel Börsch-Supan. Since then the institute is called Max Planck Institute for Social Law and Social Policy.

Conducted Research
The Department of Foreign and International Social Law is dedicated to fundamental research in the field of foreign and international social law. The Munich Center for the Economics of Aging (MEA) studies the micro- and macroeconomic aspects of demographic change including saving and retirement decisions, pension systems, health of older people. Also the Survey of Health, Ageing and Retirement in Europe is coordinated at MEA.

References

Buildings and structures in Munich
Social Law and Social Policy
Maxvorstadt
Research institutes in Munich
Social science institutes